Persatuan Sepakbola Indonesia Mempawah  (simply known as Persiwah Mempawah) is an Indonesian football club based in Mempawah Regency, West Kalimantan. They currently compete in the Liga 3 and their homeground is Opu Daeng Manambon Stadium.

References

External links

Football clubs in Indonesia
Football clubs in West Kalimantan